The Opel Zafira is a car manufactured and marketed across three generations between 1999 and 2019 by Opel. Based on the Opel Astra platform, it is developed to occupy the multi-purpose vehicle (MPV) segment.

The Zafira was also marketed under the Vauxhall marque in the United Kingdom until June 2018, the Holden marque in Australia until June 2005, and under a number of other market-specific brands and names.  

The name "Zafira" derives from the Arabic word meaning to succeed. Since 2011, it received an additional moniker as the Zafira Tourer.



Zafira A (1999) 

The first generation Zafira was internally designated as the Zafira A. Co-developed with Porsche, it debuted in concept form at the 1997 Frankfurt Auto Show and entered series production in January 1999, with sales beginning in April of that year.

The Zafira shared the T platform with the 1998 Astra G, sharing much commonality with that car. The Zafira seated seven passengers in three rows. Using a system marketed as Flex 7, the split back seat could fold into the floor to increase cargo space, without requiring removal.

Offered with a series of petrol engines and initially a single diesel offering, the "X" engines were replaced by the newer "Z" engine generation in 2000. These featured variable intake manifolds and were able to meet Euro 3 emissions standards. The 2.0-litre turbodiesels were complemented by a  2.2-litre option in January 2002.

The Zafira A body was used in GM/Opel's concept hydrogen-powered fuel cell vehicle the GM HydroGen3.

A facelift was launched in February 2003 at the Geneva Motor Show.

The Zafira ranked third in the European Car of the Year for 2000, behind only the Fiat Multipla and Toyota Yaris. In TüV's ranking of the quality of three year old cars, the Zafira was by far the best Opel; only slightly behind the winning Ford Focus.

Zafira A production ended on 25 May 2005, in Bochum. It was replaced by Zafira B in Europe, but was still sold in most other markets until 2012 (albeit that its cousin the Chevrolet Astra was discontinued in 2011), except for Australia and New Zealand, where the model was cancelled altogether.

Markets 
The Zafira was marketed in the Philippines from 2001 to 2005, as the last Europe-based Opel marketed in the Philippines after they stopped selling the Opel Astra in 2003. Although sold as the Chevrolet Zafira, it was sold alongside other Opel vehicles until it the Opel name was pulled out of the Philippine-market by its distributor, GM Philippines.

The Zafira was produced and sold in the Thailand from 2000 to 2005. it was sold alongside other Opel vehicles until it the Opel name was pulled out of the Thai-market by its distributor, GM Thailand. Thailand’s domestic family wagon segment with 3,946 units sold.

The Zafira A was sold in Malaysia as the Chevrolet Nabira.

Zafira OPC 
Introduced at Geneva in February 2001, the turbocharged Zafira OPC went on sale in October 2001. With , this was the fastest minivan on sale in Europe.

Subaru Traviq 
The Zafira was sold in Japan from August 2001 through to November 2004 as the Subaru Traviq alongside the standard Opel vehicle. In exchange, Subaru supplied the Subaru Forester as the Chevrolet Forester in India since 2003.

According to Subaru, the Traviq name was a combination of the words "travel" and "quick". Imported from Thailand, the Traviq was originally only available with the bigger 2.2 litre engine, although a 1.8 L, lower priced alternative was added in July 2003. The engines used were not Subaru supplied boxer engines, but were conventional in line units that were uncharacteristic to market recognised Subaru products, and all-wheel drive was also not available.

The sale of the Zafira as a Subaru created a conflict with previously established Yanase Co., Ltd. retail dealerships, in that Yanase was already selling Opel products, like the Zafira. When production of the Traviq ended, Yanase continued to import Opel products into Japan until 2006. It was replaced later in 2008 by the Subaru Exiga – developed from the Subaru Legacy platform.

Zafira B (2005) 

The second generation Zafira, internally designated Zafira B, debuted in Europe on 12 February 2005, with sales starting on 9 June 2005. It shared the platform and mechanical parts with the Opel Astra H. In February 2007, the Zafira B was launched in Singapore. By March 2007, the model had only been introduced in Europe and Singapore.

It went on sale in Mexico in April 2006, and Chile in September 2007. In both countries, it was branded as the Chevrolet Zafira. Although this generation was replaced in the end of 2011 by the Zafira C, this model remained in production until May 2014 as the Zafira Family. This name change occurred in markets including Germany.

Names and markets 
 Vauxhall Zafira – United Kingdom
 Chevrolet Zafira – Chile and Mexico
 Opel Zafira – Europe (except for United Kingdom), Japan, China, Hong Kong, Singapore, Taiwan & South Africa

In Mexico the Chevrolet Zafira was discontinued after the 2006 model year, and replaced by the five-passenger Chevrolet HHR.

Engines 
The Zafira B's engine line was partly carried over from the previous Astra/Zafira generation. Opel replaced the 2.0 and 2.2 turbodiesel I4 engines with 1.9 L common rail turbodiesels developed by Fiat (Multijet). Opel Performance Center developed a turbocharged  2.0 L performance version of the Zafira B as well. A CNG (Compressed Natural Gas) version of the new Zafira with a 1.6 L engine is also available.

Known issues and recall 
In December 2015, safety officials in the United Kingdom asked Vauxhall to initiate a full safety recall of the model Zafira B, due to a worrying level of car fires apparently or alleged to have been caused by 'Improper Repairs'.

The fires continued, even those recalled, and a second full safety recall was announced in May 2016, with all owners advised not to use the fan in speeds regulated by the "resistor pack" which contained a solder based unreliable safety critical thermal fuse, until the second recall, starting August 2016, had been carried out.

On 3 May 2018, a criminal investigation into Vauxhall's handling of the fires of the Zafira B and recalls was launched in the United Kingdom.

On 31 August 2019, major damage occurred in a parking garage in Cork, Ireland when an Opel Zafira caught fire.

On 7 January 2020, there was a spontaneous fire in an Opel Zafira, which caused over 200 to 300 cars in a parking garage at Stavanger Airport, Sola to be destroyed. No people were harmed.

Zafira Tourer C (2011) 

The third generation of the Zafira, called the Zafira Tourer, was previewed in concept form at the 2011 Geneva Motor Show, as the 'Zafira Tourer Concept'.

It was largely based on the Opel Astra J, and when the Zafira Tourer C went on sale, the Zafira B remained on sale from 2011 up to 2014, albeit in facelifted form as the "Zafira Family", to act as a smaller and cheaper version, as the Zafira Tourer C increased in size, to act as a proper rival to the Ford C-Max.

A hybrid/electric version was expected to follow during 2012. This car indirectly replaced the Opel Sintra, the only previous full sized Vauxhall/Opel MPV in Europe, which was discontinued in May 1999 after just three years on sale, as a slow selling product built in the United States. The production version debuted at the 2011 Frankfurt Motor Show in September, and went on sale November 2011.

A natural gas version of the Zafira Tourer was announced in December 2011. A dual fuel vehicle, its CNG tank driving the car 530 kilometres, and a 14-litre petrol tank provided additional range or operation when a CNG filling station was not available.

In June 2016, a facelift was unveiled for 2017 (with sales starting at the end of 2016), dropping 'Tourer' from the name when sold as an Opel. As part of the upgrade, new front and rear bumpers and new interior brought styling in line with the Opel Astra K. OnStar navigation was also introduced as part of an updated IntelliLink infotainment system, complete with 4G LTE hotspot, Apple CarPlay and Android Auto compatibility.

Other new options for MY2017 included adaptive LED headlights, "Opel Eye" front camera, high beam assist, traffic sign assist, forward collision warning, lane departure warning and adaptive cruise control.

In June 2018, the Vauxhall Zafira Tourer was discontinued from the United Kingdom, citing the rise of SUV and crossover vehicles.

In 2019, it was replaced by LCV-based Zafira Life.

Engines 
All engines had a six speed manual gearbox as standard, bar the 1.8 petrol, which had a five speed manual gearbox as standard. An automatic gearbox was available as an option on the 1.4T and 2.0 CDTI (165 PS), both without S/S.

In 2013, two all new engines were introduced: 1.6 SIDI Turbo petrol engine with 170 PS and 200 PS, and newly developed 1.6 CDTI diesel engine with 136 PS. In September 2014, Opel introduced its all new generation of engines – Large Diesel engines, starting with 2.0 CDTI engine with 170 PS and 400 Nm, which is a part of new strategy in which Opel will introduce seventeen new engines, in a period from 2014–2018.

Awards 
 The Zafira Tourer was awarded "Best Estate" at the German Car of the Year awards of 2012.
 The Zafira Tourer scored a five star rating in Euro NCAP.
 The Opel Zafira Tourer won the prestigious "Golden Steering Wheel 2012" award from German publications Auto Bild, Bild am Sonntag and twenty six European partner magazines.

Notes

References

External links 

 Official Opel Zafira Tourer website (Ireland)

Zafira
Cars introduced in 1999
Cars of Germany
Compact MPVs
Euro NCAP small MPVs
Front-wheel-drive vehicles